Praia Inhame is a settlement in the northern part of Príncipe Island in São Tomé and Príncipe. Its population is 128 (2012 census). Northeast is Picão, south is Santo António and west is Aeroporto settlement.

Population history

References

Populated places in the Autonomous Region of Príncipe